The speed of light is a physical constant, the rate at which light travels in a vacuum.

Speed of Light may also refer to:

Speed of light (cellular automaton), the greatest rate of information propagation in a cellular automaton
Speed of light in water = 2 × 10^8 m/s
Speed of light in glass = 2.25 × 10^8 m/s

Music
"Speed of Light", a song by the band Orchestral Manoeuvres in the Dark, from their 1991 album Sugar Tax
"Speed of Light", a song by guitarist Joe Satriani, from his 1993 album Time Machine
"Speed of Light", a song by the band Stratovarius, from their 1996 album Episode
"Speed of Light", a song by the band van Canto, from their 2008 album Hero
"Speed of Light", a song by the band Teenage Fanclub, from their 1997 album Songs from Northern Britain
"Speed of Light" (Speed song), a single by South Korea boy group Speed
Speed of Light (album), a 2009 album by Corbin Bleu
"Speed of Light" (Iron Maiden song), 2015

See also
Faster than the speed of light (disambiguation)
Lightspeed (disambiguation)
The Speed of Darkness (disambiguation)